Brian Lawrence Schwalb (born 1967), is an American politician and attorney serving as the attorney general of the District of Columbia. Schwalb won the primary election in 2022 against Bruce Spiva and Ryan Jones. Prior to becoming attorney general, Schwalb was the Partner-in-Charge of Venable LLP's D.C. office.

Early life and education  

Schwalb was born at the Washington Hospital Center in Washington, D.C. in 1967. He earned a Bachelor of Arts degree from Duke University and a Juris Doctor from Harvard Law School.

Career 
Schwalb served as a law clerk U.S. District Judge John R. Hargrove in Baltimore. After completing service as a law clerk, Schwalb joined the Department of Justice Honor Program and became a trial attorney in the United States Department of Justice Tax Division. After leaving the Department of Justice, Schwalb joined Venable LLP, where worked as the firm's vice chairman and partner-in-charge of the D.C. office.

Personal life 
Schwalb lives in the Chevy Chase neighborhood of Washington D.C. He and his wife, Mickie, have three daughters. Schwalb is Jewish and is a  member and trustee of Adas Israel Congregation.

References 

1967 births
20th-century American Jews
21st-century American Jews
District of Columbia Attorneys General
Duke University alumni
Harvard Law School alumni
Jewish American attorneys
Jewish American people in District of Columbia politics
Lawyers from Washington, D.C.
Living people
Washington, D.C., Democrats